United Waste Manufacturing Company Building, also known as the Hudson River Terminal Warehouse Company and "The Fortress",  is a historic warehouse building located at Troy, Rensselaer County, New York. It was built about 1902, and is a six-story, load bearing masonry building in the Romanesque Revival style.  It features castellated detailing, three blind arcades, crenellated corner towers, and a prominent main tower that resembles castle keep.

It was listed on the National Register of Historic Places in 2013.

References

Industrial buildings and structures on the National Register of Historic Places in New York (state)
Romanesque Revival architecture in New York (state)
Industrial buildings completed in 1902
Buildings and structures in Rensselaer County, New York
National Register of Historic Places in Troy, New York